Corrado Malaspina is the name of medieval Italian feudal lords, such as:

 Conrad Malaspina the Old, a lord of Lunigiana, political and military leader in the early 13th century Italy
 Conrad Malaspina the Young, grandson of Conrad "the old"

Italian nobility
Malaspina family